Kwadwo Kyei Frimpong is a Ghanaian politician and member of the 6th Parliament of the 4th Republic of Ghana representing the people of Bosome Freho in the Ashanti Region of Ghana.

Early years and education 
Frimpong was born on August 26, 1946 in a town called Amansie Nsuaem in the Ashanti region. He had his Bachelor of Science degree in Land Economy from Kwame Nkrumah University of Science and Technology, Kumasi in 1974.

Career 
He is a chattered surveyor and worked at Land Commission, Accra as Senior Lands Officer.

Personal life 
He is a Christian and married with five children.

Political career 
Frimpong began his political career in 2012 after defeating his opposition with 57.82%.

References 

Living people
1946 births
Ghanaian MPs 2013–2017
People from Ashanti Region